Qeshlaq-e Hajjilar (also Romanized as Qeshlāq-e Ḩājjīlār and Qeshlāq-e Ḩājjīlar) is a village in Qeshlaq Rural District, in the Central District of Ahar County, East Azerbaijan Province, Iran. At the 2006 census, its population was 24, in 5 families.

References 

Populated places in Ahar County